Tongue n' Cheek is the fourth studio album by British rapper Dizzee Rascal. The album was released on 20 September 2009 and includes the number one singles, "Dance wiv Me", "Bonkers", "Holiday" and "Dirtee Disco". It has been certified platinum by the BPI for sales of over 300,000, making it the best-selling album of Rascal's career.

Background
Its release was announced on Friday Night with Jonathan Ross when, in an interview, Rascal revealed details including track information and production. He confirmed in an interview on Radio 1 that he is leaving his grime roots behind, in favour of more mainstream pop music. On 23 May 2009, Calvin Harris revealed on his Twitter that he was producing a Dizzee track. At the Evolution Festival in Newcastle-upon-Tyne, he confirmed that there will be two new singles from the album called "Road Rage" and "Dirtee Cash". Dirtee Cash heavily samples The Adventures of Stevie V song "Dirty Cash.". Samples are also used on "Can't Tek No More" ("Warrior's Charge" by Aswad from the film Babylon) and "Chillin' Wiv da Man Dem" ("Oh Honey" by Delegation).

In early August the track listing was confirmed in a preview of the album by music website NME.

Notably, Rascal designed a Nike-distributed Tongue n' Cheek shoe, to be in released at the same time as the album. The proceeds from these shoes going to Tower Hamlets Summer University of which Rascal is a patron.

Release and chart performance
On 27 September 2009, Tongue n' Cheek entered the UK Albums Chart at number 3, charting behind Muse's The Resistance and Madonna's Celebration.

Critical reception

Tongue n' Cheek received positive reviews from music critics. At Metacritic, which assigns a normalised rating out of 100 to reviews from mainstream critics, the album received an average score of 75 based on 14 reviews, which indicates "generally favorable reviews". The Guardian gave the album 4 out of 5 stars, opining: "If it's less wilfully uncommercial than his earlier oeuvre, which frequently made the listener feel like they were being mugged in the middle of an amusement arcade, its distorted synthesisers are still edgily thrilling". Pitchforks Ian Cohen gave the album 7.5/10, saying that "He sounds damn good over trashy, flashy electro that manages to keep pace with cadences as hyperactive as his own, and, above all, he's way more fun than he's often given credit for".

NME gave the album 7/10 and wrote that "The beats on Tongue N' Cheek are still raw, clamorous and unpredictable, but in a springy, primary-coloured way". Q magazine gave it a favourable review, saying "It's been a long time coming, but Brit-rap's first genuinely huge album is here". musicOMH gave it 4 out of 5 stars and wrote: "There's a party to be had and Dizzee's in charge, but don't forget to engage your brain for at least some of it". Observer Music Monthly gave it 4 out of 5 stars, writing: "It unquestionably adds up to a pop record sharp enough to be the bratty but irresistible younger brother of Lily Allen's "It's Not Me, It's You". RapReviews gave the album 8.5/10 and judged: "All in all, Dizzee hasn't gone all out to make an artistic masterpiece, but it doesn't make the slightest bit of difference".

Track listing

A bonus disc entitled "Foot n' Mouth" comes free with the album when purchased from HMV.  It contains a single track of 27:54 containing a Dirtee Stank podcast with the following contents:

Dirtee deluxe edition: An expanded version of the album was released in 2010 to celebrate the album going platinum.

Charts

Weekly charts

Year-end charts

Certifications

References

2009 albums
Dizzee Rascal albums
Albums produced by Calvin Harris
Albums produced by Danja (record producer)
Liberation Records albums
Hip house albums